Miss USA 2022 was the 71st Miss USA pageant. The competition was held on October 3, 2022 at the Grand Sierra Resort in Reno, Nevada and was broadcast on the FYI cable channel. The competition was hosted by Zuri Hall for the second consecutive year, while Julissa Bermudez and Micah Jesse served as sideline correspondents. This competition was also rebroadcast on October 19, 2022 on the official YouTube channel.

Elle Smith of Kentucky crowned R'Bonney Gabriel of Texas as her successor at the end of the event. She later represented the United States at Miss Universe 2022. This was Texas' tenth Miss USA title and first win in 14 years.

Gabriel went on to win the Miss Universe title roughly three months later in New Orleans, becoming the ninth American woman to do so. With her win, her first runner-up, Morgan Romano of North Carolina, assumed the Miss USA title on January 27, 2023 in a crowning ceremony in Auburn, Alabama. Romano became the fourth woman from North Carolina to hold the Miss USA title.

Background

Location, hosts, and performer

On July 14, 2022, it was reported that the competition would be held in Reno, Nevada, with the city securing a three-year deal to host the pageant for the next three years. This would be the second time that the pageant is held in Reno, following Miss USA 2019. The following day, it was confirmed that the pageant would be held at the Grand Sierra Resort on October 3. Crystle Stewart confirmed that the location was chosen to honor Cheslie Kryst, whom had been crowned Miss USA 2019 in the same venue and had committed suicide in January 2022.

In September 2022, it was announced that the competition would be hosted by Zuri Hall for the second consecutive year, while Julissa Bermudez and Micah Jesse would serve as sideline correspondents and Chloe Flower would perform.

Selection of contestants
The COVID-19 pandemic impacted the duration between most of the state pageants from the previous year's competition, with previous year's state titleholders' reign being shortened to eight to eleven months into their calendar year, depending on state. Delegates from the 50 states and the District of Columbia are selected in state pageants in a period began in September 2021 and scheduled to end in July 2022 to avoid scheduling conflicts with Miss America 2023 state pageants, as the state pageant schedule can become very dense between the last state pageant held from 2021. The first state pageants were Idaho and Montana, held together on September 12, 2021, and the last state pageant was Colorado, held on July 3, 2022.

Eleven delegates have previously competed in Miss Teen USA and Miss America, eight are former Miss Teen USA state winners, two are a former Miss America state titleholders, and one is a former Miss America's Outstanding Teen state titleholder.

Controversy 
Moments after the final competition when R'Bonney Gabriel was crowned Miss USA, allegations emerged that the competition had been rigged for Gabriel to win. Several of the contestants, including Miss Montana USA Heather Lee O'Keefe and Miss Georgia USA Holly Haynes, expressed in disbelief and claimed that Gabriel allegedly travelled to Nizuc Resort and Spa in Cancún a couple of weeks after Gabriel was crowned Miss Texas USA and was able to shoot promotional material, which the resort's Instagram account posted less than 24 hours after the final competition. Nizuc has been become one of the pageant's sponsors since national director and Miss USA 2008 Crystle Stewart took over at the end of 2020 after Miss USA and Miss Teen USA were separated from the Miss Universe Organization. Both Gabriel and Miss Colorado USA Alexis Glover, were not included in the official Cancún retreat along with the rest of the contestants as Texas and Colorado had not yet crowned at the time of the retreat. In an interview with E! News, Gabriel denied claims that the pageant was rigged, stating "I would never enter any pageant or any competition that I know I would win."

Results

Final results 

§ – Voted into Top 16 through the online vote.∞ – Gabriel won Miss Universe 2022. Due to protocol, Gabriel relinquished her title and the 1st Runner-Up, Morgan Romano, assumed the Miss USA title.

Special awards

Pageant

Judges
Ashlee Clarke – American businesswoman and producer
Soo Yeon Lee – South Korean table tennis player and model
Kirk Myers – American fitness trainer
Olivia Ponton – American model and social media influencer
Aaron Potts – American fashion designer
Nicole Williams-English – Canadian fashion designer and model

Contestants
51 contestants competed for the title.

Notes

References

External links

 Miss USA official website
 

2022
2022 beauty pageants
October 2022 events in the United States
2022 in Nevada
Beauty pageants in the United States
2022 controversies in the United States